Canon City State Armory is a historic armory building in Cañon City, Colorado. Its design has been credited to Denver architect John J. Huddart. It is listed on the National Register of Historic Places listings in Fremont County, Colorado.

See also
Fort Collins Armory

References

Armories on the National Register of Historic Places in Colorado
Government buildings completed in 1922
Buildings and structures in Cañon City, Colorado
National Register of Historic Places in Fremont County, Colorado
1922 establishments in Colorado